This is a list of tourism journals: peer-reviewed academic journals covering the study of all aspects of tourism.

 International Journal of Tourism Sciences
 Journal of Hospitality & Tourism Research
 Event Management
 Journal of Interpretation Research
 Journal of Sustainable Tourism
 Journal of Travel Research
 Journal of Vacation Marketing
 Tourism and Hospitality Research
 Tourist Studies
Tourism
Journals
Journals